The 2007 Nigerian Senate election in Oyo State was held on 21 April 2007, to elect members of the Nigerian Senate to represent Oyo State. Teslim Kolawole Folarin representing Oyo Central, Kamorudeen Adekunle Adedibu representing Oyo South and Andrew Abidemi Babalola representing Oyo North all won on the platform of the People's Democratic Party.

Overview

Summary

Results

Oyo Central 
The election was won by Teslim Kolawole Folarin of the Peoples Democratic Party (Nigeria).

Oyo South 
The election was won by Kamorudeen Adedibu of the Peoples Democratic Party (Nigeria).

Oyo North
The election was won by Andrew Abidemi Babalola of the Peoples Democratic Party (Nigeria).

References 

April 2007 events in Nigeria
Oyo State Senate elections
Oyo